The Vermont Organization of Koha Automated Libraries (VOKAL) is an organization of libraries in the U.S. State of Vermont.  It provides a unified, online library catalog using the open source, Koha integrated library system.  It was established as a part of the Green Mountain Library Consortium.

History
The Vermont Organization of Koha Automated Libraries had its earliest beginnings in the fall of 2007, when several Vermont libraries, using Follett Co.'s Destiny Integrated Library System(ILS) (with the help of the Vermont Department of Libraries), began looking at open source alternatives.

In September 2010, the first libraries began being added to the VOKAL catalog.

Current status 
As of February 2016, it had grown to 57 member libraries (55 public libraries, 1 school library, and 1 church library).

VOKAL's catalog also allows users to search Listen Up Vermont (http://www.listenupvermont.org), a shared database of lendable e-books and audiobooks, also operated by the Green Mountain Library Consortium. In addition, VOKAL's catalog also allows users to search the Project Gutenberg Archive, and download its items.

Database hosting 

VOKAL's common Koha database and software are hosted by ByWater Solutions.

Catamount Library Network 

There is currently one other unified public library catalog in Vermont, the Catamount Library Network, also hosted by ByWater Solutions.

Member libraries

Total number of members:

References

External links 
 VOKAL
 VOKAL Catalog
 VOKAL Facebook Page
 Green Mountain Library Consortium
 Vermont Department of Libraries

Library consortia in Vermont